Hans-Jürgen Bäumler (born 28 January 1942) is a German former pair skater, actor, and Schlager singer.

Career

Bäumler became famous in pair skating with his skating partner Marika Kilius. Between 1958 and 1964, they won the German nationals four times, became European champion six times, and world champion in pair skating twice. Their coach was Erich Zeller. The duo won a silver medal at the 1960 Olympic Winter Games, and Bäumler became one of the youngest male figure skating Olympic medalists. In 1964, they won a silver medal again.

The duo had signed professional contracts and skated as professionals with Holiday on Ice before the 1964 Olympics, a violation of their amateur status and strict IOC rules. In 1966, they were stripped of the medal because of this. As The New York Times reported, the IOC "quietly re-awarded the West Germans their silver medals in 1987, 23 years after the Innsbruck Games, at an executive board meeting in Istanbul. The couple was deemed 'rehabilitated.'"

After their amateur figure skating career, both became singers of German Schlagers (German version of pop songs). In the mid-1960s, they recorded some songs together; Bäumler also had songs as a solo singer. Bäumler's greatest success was the song "Wunderschönes fremdes Mädchen" ("Beautiful Foreign Girl"). The most successful songs of the duo were "Wenn die Cowboys träumen" ("When Cowboys Dream") and "Honeymoon in St. Tropez", both in 1964.

From 1964, Bäumler has also worked as an actor. In 1969, he had a main role in The White Horse Inn, and in 1970 in Maske in Blau (Mask in Blue), both operettas. He was also successful in the television series Salto Mortale. In the mid-1970s, Bäumler hosted several quiz shows, among others Der Apfel fällt nicht weit vom Stamm ("The apple does not fall far from the trunk"), Das waren Hits ("These were hits"), and Was wäre wenn ("What if") on ZDF. Between 1990 and 1993, he worked for RTL. Later, he was also seen as a theatre actor.

Personal life
Since 1974, Bäumler has been married to Marina, a teacher. The couple has two sons, Christoph and Bastian, and lives in Nice, France.

Results

Men's singles

Pairs with Marika Kilius

Filmography 
 1964: Die große Kür (The great free program)
 1965: Die Liebesquelle (The love source)
 1965: Call of the Forest
 1966: Happy End am Wolfgangsee (Happy End at the Lake Wolfgang)
 1966: The Sinful Village
 1967:  (The great happiness)
 1967: Paradies der flotten Sünder (Paradies of perky sinners)
 1970:  (Hooray, our parents are not here)
 1971: Holidays in Tyrol
 1972: Die lustigen Vier von der Tankstelle (The comic Four from the petrol station)
 1973: Sonja schafft die Wirklichkeit ab oder … ein unheimlich starker Abgang (Sonja abolishes reality or …  A weird strong leave)

Schlager songs (selection) 
 "Wenn die Cowboys träumen" 1964 (with Marika Kilius)
 "Honeymoon in St. Tropez" 1964 (with Marika Kilius)
 "Wunderschönes fremdes Mädchen" 1964
 "Sorry little Baby" 1964

Awards 
In 1965, Bäumler as a singer received the bronze "Löwe von Radio Luxemburg".

References

1942 births
Living people
German male pair skaters
Olympic figure skaters of the United Team of Germany
Olympic silver medalists for the United Team of Germany
Olympic medalists in figure skating
Figure skaters at the 1960 Winter Olympics
Figure skaters at the 1964 Winter Olympics
Medalists at the 1960 Winter Olympics
Medalists at the 1964 Winter Olympics
World Figure Skating Championships medalists
European Figure Skating Championships medalists
People from Dachau
Sportspeople from Upper Bavaria
RTL Group people